A death anniversary (or deathday) is the anniversary of the death of a person. It is the opposite of birthday. It is a custom in several Asian cultures, including Azerbaijan,   Armenia, Cambodia, China, Georgia, Hong Kong, Taiwan, India, Myanmar, Iran, Israel, Japan, Bangladesh, Korea, Nepal, Pakistan, the Philippines, Russia, Sri Lanka and Vietnam, as well as in other places with significant overseas Chinese, Japanese, Jewish, Korean, and Vietnamese populations, to observe the anniversary on which a family member or other significant individual died. There are also similar memorial services that are held at different intervals, such as every week.

Although primarily a manifestation of ancestor worship, the tradition has also been associated with Confucianism and Buddhism (in East Asian cultural civilizations) or Hinduism and Buddhism (South Asia but mainly in India, Nepal and Sri Lanka and Southeast Asia). In Judaism (the majority religion of Israel), such a commemoration is called a yahrtzeit (among other terms). Celebration of mass in memory of a loved one on or near the anniversary of their death is also a part of Roman Catholic Christian tradition.

By culture

China
This type of ceremony dates back thousands of years in China (at least to the Shang dynasty) and historically involved making sacrifices to the spirits of one's ancestors.

Indian Subcontinent 

In India (and Nepal), a death anniversary is known as shraadh (Shraaddha "श्राद्ध" in Nepali). The first death anniversary is called a barsy, from the word baras, meaning year in Hindi.

Shraadh means to give with devotion or to offer one's respect. Shraadh is a ritual for expressing one's respectful feelings for the ancestors. According to Nepali and Indian texts, a soul has to wander about in the various worlds after death and has to suffer a lot due to past karmas. Shraadh is a means of alleviating this suffering.

Shraddhyaa Kriyate Yaa Saaश्रद्धया क्रियते या सा  : Shraadh is the ritual accomplished to satiate one's ancestors. Shraadh is a private ceremony performed by the family members of the departed soul. Though not mandated spiritually, it is typically performed by the eldest son and other siblings join in offering prayers together.

Japan

Korea

In Korea, ancestor worship ceremonies are referred to by the generic term jerye. Notable examples of jerye include Munmyo jerye and Jongmyo jerye, which are performed periodically each year for venerated Confucian scholars and kings of ancient times, respectively.

The ceremony held on the anniversary of a family member's death is called gije, and is celebrated by families as a private ceremony. For such occasions, the women of the family traditionally prepare an elaborate set of dishes, including tteok, jeon, jeok, and so forth.

Philippines 
In the Philippines, the funeral is only one part of an elaborate mourning tradition. For nine days after the funeral has taken place, novena prayers are offered in a practice called pasiyam (although some start the practice the night after the death). It is also customary for another service to be given on the fortieth day after the death, as it is traditionally believed that the souls of the dead wander the Earth for forty days.

One year after the death, the first year death anniversary (literally "lowering of mourning") is commemorated with the final service. After the babang luksa, the spouse of the deceased can remarry, and the family can once again hold birthday celebrations and attend parties. The miscellaneous non-valuable belongings of the deceased will also be symbolically burned to represent the mourners being able to move on with their lives. Babang luksa is normally commemorated with a meal and prayers ("padasal") for the deceased. For one year after a death, mourners dress all in black or wear a black pin as a remembrance during their daily lives. After babang luksa, the mourners may once again return to their normal dress, although depending on circumstances, some may opt to wear their mourning attire for longer periods.

Although only the first anniversary of the death is specifically commemorated, Filipinos further commemorate the deaths of all of their ancestors at their grave sites on All Saints' Day (November 1) and All Souls' Day (November 2).

Vietnam

It is a festive occasion, at which members of an extended family gather together. Female family members traditionally spend the entire day cooking an elaborate banquet in honor of the deceased individual, which will then be enjoyed by all the family members. In addition, sticks of incense are burned in honor and commemoration of the deceased person. The rituals are the responsibility of whoever inherits the ancestral estates, typically the deceased's most senior patrilineal descendant.

The commemoration of the Hùng Kings - who were instrumental in founding the first Vietnamese kingdom in Vietnam's remote past, and of the Trưng Sisters are widely participated. In March 2007 Giỗ tổ Hùng Vương became a public holiday in Vietnam. As in all traditional commemorations, the Vietnamese calendar is used, except Vietnamese Catholics who commemorate the dead anniversary in Gregorian calendar.

In Vietnamese culture, certain special, traditional dishes (particularly desserts) are only prepared for death anniversary banquets. In addition, favorite foods of the deceased person being honored are also prepared. Chicken, a particularly prized meat in Vietnam, is often cooked as well. In Central Vietnam, small stuffed glutinous rice flour balls wrapped in leaves called  are such a dish. Because the preparation of so many complex dishes is time-consuming, some families purchase or hire caterers to prepare certain dishes. It is also common that a soft-boiled egg be prepared and then given to the oldest grandson.

Sri Lanka
In Sri Lanka, people commonly commemorate death anniversaries after 7 days, 3 months, and 1 year and 2 years with alms giving either to monks or to the needy after their passing.

Western Christianity
In Western Christianity, it became custom during the Middle Ages to commemorate the deceased after 3, 7 and 30 days as well as 1 year after their passing. In addition to this, pious donors made endowments to religious institutions in order to being commemorated in an annual mass on the date of their deaths. These services were referred to as anniversaries (Latin anniversarium), obiits or chantries. The German term is Jahrzeit, from which the Yiddish term Yahrtzeit is derived in Judaism.

In order to provide this service, monasteries and collegiate churches wrote the names of the donors down in calendrical registers called anniversary books. There was no temporal limit to this spiritual service, obliging institutions to perpetual commemoration until Judgment Day.

Judaism

Observant Jews commemorate the yahrtzeit of the death of parents, siblings, spouses, or children according to the Hebrew calendar. The main observance involves recitation of kaddish prayer, and a widely practiced custom is to light a special candle that burns for 24 hours, called a yahrtzeit candle.

See also 
 Chinese ancestor veneration
 National day of mourning
 Transfer of merit

References

External links
 Article about Vietnamese death anniversary tradition
 Article

Anniversaries
Bereavement in Judaism
Asian culture
Practices in Chinese folk religion
Religious Confucianism
Filial piety
Anniversary
Observances honoring the dead